This is an alphabetical list of the songs known to have been recorded, written, and/or performed by Johnny Cash between the beginning of his career in 1954 and his death in 2003.



0-9 
 The 20th Century Is Almost Over
 25 Minutes to Go
 7:06 Union

A 
 Abner Brown 
 Accidentally on Purpose
 Adios Aloha
 Adulterous Woman
 After All
 After Taxes 
 After the Ball 
 Against the Wind
 Agony in Gethsemane
 Ah Bos Cee Dah
 Ain’t Gonna Hobo No more
 Ain't Gonna Work Tomorrow
 Ain’t No Grave
 Ain't You Ashamed
 All Around Cowboy
 All I Do Is Drive 
 All Of God's Children Ain't Free 
 All Over Again
 Allegheny
 Aloha Oe
 Always Alone 
 Always on My Mind
 Amen
 American Remains
 American by Birth
 American Trilogy
 Ancient History 
 And Now He's Alone
 Angel And the Badman 
 Angel Band
 Angels Love Bad Men
 Another Broken Hearted Girl
 Another Man Done Gone
 Another Song to Sing
 Another Wide River to Cross
 Anthem ’84
 Any Old Wind That Blows
 Apache Tears
 Appalachian Pride
 Are All the Children In
 Are You Washed In The Blood
 Arkansas Lovin’ Man
 As Long as I Live
 As Long as The Grass Shall Grow
 Ascension Amen Chorus
 At Calvary
 At the Cross
 At the Wailing Wall
 Austin Prison 
 Away in a Manger

B 
 (I'm Proud The) Baby Is Mine
 Baby Ride Easy
 Back In The Saddle Again
 A Backstage Pass
 Bad News 
 Ballad Of A Teenage Queen 
 The Ballad Of Annie Palmer
 The Ballad Of Barbara
 The Ballad Of Boot Hill
 The Ballad Of Forty Dollars
 The Ballad Of Jesse James
 The Ballad of Ira Hayes
 Ballad Of Little Fauss And Big Halsy
 Ballad Of The Ark
 Ballad Of The Harp Weaver
 Bandana
 The Banks Of The Ohio 
 The Baron
 The Battle Of Nashville
 The Battle Of New Orleans
 Be Careful Who You Love (Arthur's Song)
 Beans For Breakfast 
 The Beast In Me
 A Beautiful Day
 Beautiful Life
 Beautiful Memphis
 Beautiful Words
 Before My Time 
 Begin West Movement 
 Believe In Him
 A Believer Sings The Truth
 Belshazzar 
 Ben Dewberry's Final Run
 Besser so, Jenny-Joe [Original German song]
 Best Friend
 Best of All Possible Worlds
 Better Class Of Losers
 Big Balls In Nashville
 The Big Battle
 Big Foot 
 Big Iron 
 The Big Light
 Big River 
 Big Train (From Memphis)
 Bill's Theme
 Billy And Rex And Oral And Bob
 Billy Brown
 Bird On A Wire 
 A Bird With A Broken Wing
 Blessed Are
 Blistered 
 The Blizzard
 Blue Bandana
 Blue Christmas 
 Blue Train 
 Blueberry Hill
 Blues For Two
 The Blues Keep Gettin' Bluer
 Blue Yodel #1
 Blue Yodel #5
 Boa Constrictor
 Bonanza! 
 Boogie
 Borderline (A Musical Whodunit)
 Born And Raised In Black And White
 Born To Lose
 Boss Jack 
 Bottom Of A Mountain
 A Boy Named Sue
 Brakeman's Blues
 Brand New Dance
 Breaking Bread 
 Bridge Over Troubled Water
 Broken Freedom Song
 Broken Hearted Lover
 Brown Eyes
 Brown-Eyed Handsome Man
 The Bug That Tried To Crawl Around The World
 Bull Rider
 Burden Of Freedom
 Bury Me Not On The Lone Prairie 
 Busted

C 
 Cajun Born
 Calilou
 Call Daddy From The Mine(s) 
 Call Me The Breeze
 Call Of The Wild
 Can't Help But Wonder Where I'm Bound
 Careless Love
 The Caretaker
 Casey
 Casey Jones 
 Casey's Last Ride 
 Cat's in the Cradle 
 The Cattle Call
 'Cause I Love You
 A Ceiling, Four Walls, And A Floor
 A Certain Kinda Hurtin'
 Chain Gang 
 Change The Locks
 Chattanooga City Limit Sign
 Chattanooga Sugarbabe
 The Chicken In Black
 Children
 Children, Go Where I Send Thee
 Choosing Of Twelve Disciples
 Christmas As I Knew It 
 The Christmas Guest
 The Christmas Spirit
 Christmas Time's A Comin'
 Christmas With You
 (I'm Just An Old) Chunk Of Coal (But I'll Be A Diamond Someday)
 Church In The Wildwood
 Church Of The Holy Sepulchre
 Cindy 
 Cindy, I Love You
 Cisco Clifton's Fillin' Station 
 City Jail
 City Of New Orleans
 Class Of '55
 Clean Your Own Tables
 Clementine
 Close The Door Lightly
 Closer To The Bone
 Cloudburst
 Cocaine Blues
 Cocaine Carolina
 Cold Shoulder 
 Cold, Cold, Heart 
 Cold, Lonesome Morning 
 The Color Of Love
 Come Along And Ride This Train 
 Come In, Stranger 
 Come Take A Trip In My Airship 
 Come To The Wailing Wall
 Come Unto Me
 Coming Home
 Committed To Parkview
 Concerning Your New Song
 The Continuance
 Cool Water
 Cotton Fields
 Cotton Pickin' Hands
 Country Boy 
 Country Pie
 Country Trash 
 The Cowboy Who Started The Fight
 The Cowboy's Prayer
 Cowboys And Ladies
 Crazy
 Crazy Old Soldier
 The Cremation of Sam McGee
 A Croft In Clachan (The Ballad Of Rob MacDunn)
 Crossing The Sea Of Galilee
 Crucifixion
 Cry! Cry! Cry! 
 Crystal Chandeliers And Burgundy
 Cuban Soldier
 A Cup Of Coffee
 Custer

D 
 Daddy
 Daddy Sang Bass 
 The Danger Zone
 Danny Boy
 Dark As A Dungeon
 Darling Am I The One
 Darlin' Companion
 Daughter Of A Railroad Man
 A Day In The Grand Canyon
 Dear Mrs.
 Death And Hell
 The Death Of Me
 Delia's Gone 
 Deportee (Plane Wreck At Los Gatos)
 Desperado 
 Desperados Waiting For A Train
 Destination Victoria Station
 Detroit City
 The Devil Comes Back to Georgia
 The Devil To Pay
 The Devil's Right Hand
 Diamonds In The Rough
 Didn't It Rain
 Dinosaur Song 
 The Diplomat
 Dirty Old Egg-Suckin' Dog
 Do Lord
 Do What You Do, Do Well
 Doesn't Anybody Know My Name
 Doin' My Time
 Don't Go Near The Water 
 Don't Make Me Go 
 Don't Sell Daddy Any More Whiskey
 Don't Step On Mother's Roses 
 Don't Take Anyone To Be Your Friend (Don't Take Everybody For Your Friend)
 Don't Take Your Guns To Town
 Don't Think Twice, It's Alright 
 Dorraine Of Ponchartrain 
 Down At Drippin’ Springs
 Down In The Valley
 Down The Line 
 Down The Road I Go
 Down The Street To 301
 Down There By The Train
 The Drifter
 Drink To Me Only With Thine Eyes
 Drive On 
 Drums
 Duelin' Dukes

E 
 Earthquake And Darkness
 East Virginia Blues
 Easy Street
 Empty Chair
 The End Of Understanding
 Engine 143 (One-Forty-Three)
 The Engineer's Dying Child
 Even Cowgirls Get The Blues
 The Evening Train
 Everybody Loves A Nut
 Everybody's Trying To Be My Baby
 Everyone Gets Crazy
 Everything Is Beautiful

F 
 Face Of Despair
 Fair And Tender Ladies
 Fair Weather Friends
 Family Bible
 Far Away Places
 Far Side Banks Of Jordan
 Farmer's Almanac
 Farther Along
 Fast Boat to Sydney
 A Fast Song
 Father And Daughter (Father And Son)
 Feast Of The Passover
 Feeding The Multitude
 Field Of Diamonds
 Figgy Puddin'
 The First Noel
 First Time Ever I Saw Your Face
 Fisher's Of Men
 Five Feet High And Rising
 Five Minutes To Live 
 Flesh And Blood
 The Flint Arrowhead
 Flushed From The Bathroom Of Your Heart
 Fly Little Bird
 The Folk Singer
 Folks Out On The Road
 Follow Me
 Follow Me Jesus
 Folsom Prison Blues 
 Fool's Hall Of Fame
 Foolish Questions
 For Lovin' Me
 For The Good Times
 For You
 Forever Young
 Forty Shades Of Green
 Four Months To Live
 Four Strong Winds
 The Fourth Man (In The Fire)
 Frankie's Man, Johnny
 Friendly Gates
 Friends In California
 From Sea To Shining Sea
 A Front Row Seat to Hear Ole Johnny Sing
 The Frozen Four Hundred Pound Fair To Middlin' Cotton Picker
 The Frozen Logger
 Fuego De'amor [Spanish version of Ring of Fire]
 Funny How Time Slips Away
 Further On (Up The Road)

G 
 Gadsby's Restaurant
 Galway Bay
 The Gambler
 Gathering Flowers For The Beautiful Bouquet
 Gathering Flowers From The Hillside
 The General Lee
 Gentle On My Mind
 Georgia On A Fast Train
 Get in Line, Brother
 Get Rhythm
 The Gettysburg Address
 (Ghost) Riders In The Sky
 The Gifts They Gave
 Girl from the Canyon
 Girl from the North Country
 Girl in Saskatoon
 Give It Away
 Give Me Back My Job
 Give My Love To Rose
 Go On Blues
 Go Wild
 God Ain't No Stained Glass Window
 God Bless Robert E Lee 
 God Is Not Dead
 God Must Have My Fortune Laid Away
 God Will
 God's Gonna Cut You Down
 God's Hands
 Godshine
 Goin' by the Book
 Goin' Down the Road Feelin' Bad
 Going to Memphis
 Gone
 Gone Girl
 The Good Earth
 Good Morning Friend
 Good Old American Guest
 Good Old Mountain Dew
 The Good, the Bad, and the Cookie Kid
 Goodbye, Little Darlin', Goodbye
 Goodnight Irene
 Gospel Boogie
 Gospel Road
 Gospel Ship
 (My) Grandfather's Clock
 Great Commission
 The Great Speckle(d) Bird
 Greater Love Hath No Man
 The Greatest Cowboy of Them All
 Greatest Love Affair
 Green Grow the Lilacs
 Green, Green Grass of Home
 Greystone Chapel
 Guess Things Happen That Way

H 
 A Half a Mile a Day
 Hammers and Nails
 Hank and Joe and Me
 Happiness Is You
 Happy to Be with You
 Hard Times (Come Again No More)
 Hard Times Comin'
 The Hard Way
 Hardin Wouldn't Run
 Hark! The Herald Angels Sing
 Harley
 Have A Drink Of Water
 Have Thine Own Way Lord
 Have You Ever Seen the Rain
 He Is Risen
 He Stopped Loving Her Today
 He Touched Me
 He Turned The Water Into Wine
 He'll Be A Friend
 He'll Understand and Say Well Done
 He's Alive
 Heart Of Gold
 Heartbeat
 Heavy Metal (Don't Mean Rock And Roll To Me)
 Hello Again
 Hello Out There
 Help Him, Jesus
 Help Me
 Help Me Make It Through The Night
 Here Comes that Rainbow Again
 Here Was A Man
 Heroes
 Heroes In Black And White
 Hey Good Lookin'
 Hey Hey Train
 Hey Porter
 Hiawatha's Vision
 Hidden Shame
 High Heel Sneakers
 Highway Patrolman
 The Highwayman
 Hit The Road And Go
 The Hobo Song
 Home of the Blues
 Honky Tonk Girl
 The House Is Falling Down
 How Beautiful Heaven Must Be
 How Did You Get Away From Me
 How Great Thou Art
 The Human Condition
 Hung My Head
 Hungry
 Hurt
 Hurt So Bad

I 
 I Ain't A Song
 I Am A Pilgrim
 I Am The Nation
 (I Been To) Georgia On A Fast Train
 I Call Him
 I Came To Believe
 I Can't Go On That Way
 I Can't Help It (If I'm Still In Love With You)
 I Corinthians 15:55
 I Could Never Be Ashamed Of You
 I Couldn't Keep from Crying
 I Do Believe
 I Don't Believe You Wanted To Leave
 I Don't Hurt Anymore
 I Don't Know Where I'm Bound
 I Don't Think I Could Take You Back Again
 I Dreamed About Mama Last Night 
 I Feel Better All Over
 I Forgot More Than You'll Ever Know
 I Forgot To Remember To Forget
 I Got A Boy (And His Name Is John)
 I Got a Woman
 I Got Shoes
 I Got Stripes
 (I) Guess Things Happen That Way
 I Hardly Ever Sing Beer Drinking Songs
 (I Heard That) Lonesome Whistle (Blow)
 I Heard The Bells On Christmas Day
 I Hung My Head
 I Just Thought You'd Like To Know
 I Love You Because
 I Love You Sweetheart
 I Love You, Love You
 I Never Got To Know Him Very Well
 I Never Met A Man Like You Before
 I Never Picked Cotton
 I Promise You
 I Ride An Old Paint
 I Saw A Man
 I Saw The Light
 I See A Darkness
 I See Men As Trees Walking
 I Shall Be Free
 I Shall Not Be Moved
 I Still Miss Someone
 I Talk To Jesus Every Day
 I Threw It All Away
 I Tremble For You
 I Walk The Line
 I Want To Go Home
 I Wanted So
 I Was There When It Happened (So I Guess I Ought To Know)
 I Washed My Face In The Morning Dew
 I Will Dance With You
 I Will Miss You When You Go
 I Will Rock and Roll with You
 I Wish I Was Crazy Again 
 I Witness a Crime
 I Won't Back Down (feat. Tom Petty)
 I Won't Have to Cross Jordan Alone
 I Would Like to See You Again
 I'd Just Be Fool Enough (To Fall)
 I'd Rather Die Young
 I'd Rather Have You
 I'd Still Be There
 I'll Always Love You (in My Own Crazy Way)
 I'll Be All Smiles Tonight
 I'll Be Home for Christmas
 I'll Be Loving You
 I'll Cross Over Jordon Someday
 I'll Fly Away
 I'll Go Somewhere And Sing My Songs Again
 I'll Have a New Life
 I'll Remember You
 I'll Say It's True
 I'll Take You Home Again Kathleen
 I'm A Drifter 
 I'm A Newborn Man
 I'm A Worried Man
 I'm Alright Now
 I'm An Easy Rider
 I'm An Old Cow Hand
 I'm Bound For The Promised Land
 I'm Free From The Chain Gang Now
 I'm Going To Memphis
 I'm Gonna Sit On The Porch And Pick On My Old Guitar
 I'm Gonna Try To Be That Way
 I'm Here To Get My Baby Out Of Jail 
 (I'm Just An Old) Chunk Of Coal (But I'll Be A Diamond Someday)
 I'm Leavin' Now
 I'm Movin' On
 I'm Never Gonna Roam Again
 I'm On Fire
 (I'm Proud) The Baby Is Mine
 I'm Ragged but I'm Right
 I'm So Lonesome I Could Cry
 I'm Thinking Tonight of My Blue Eyes
 I'm Working On A Building 
 I've Always Been Crazy
 I've Been Everywhere
 I've Been Saved
 I've Been Working On The Railroad
 I've Got A Thing About Trains
 I've Got Jesus In My Soul
 I've Never Met A Man Like You Before
 If He Came Back Again
 If I Give My Soul 
 If I Had A Hammer
 If I Were A Carpenter
 If It Wasn't For The Wabash River
 If Jesus Ever Loved A Woman
 If Not For Love
 If The Good Lord's Willing 
 If We Never Meet Again This Side Of Heaven 
 If You Could Read My Mind 
 Impersonations
 Interlude
 In A Young Girl's Mind
 In Bethlehem
 In God's Hands
 In My Life 
 In Our Mind
 In The Garden 
 In The Garden Of Gethsemane
 In The Jailhouse Now 
 In The Sweet By And By
 (In Them Old) Cotton Fields (Back Home)
 In Virginia [Original German song]
 In Your Mind 
 Introduction Under The Double Eagle
 The Invertebrates
 Is This My Destiny
 It Ain't Gonna Worry My Mind
 It Ain't Me, Babe 
 It Ain’t Nothin' New Babe
 It Came Upon A Midnight Clear 
 It Comes And Goes
 It Could Be You (Instead Of Him) 
 It Is No Secret (What God Can Do) 
 It Is What It Is
 It Takes One to Know Me
 It Was Jesus (Who Was It?) 
 It'll Be Her 
 It's a Sin to Tell a Lie
 It's All Over 
 It's Alright
 It's Just About Time

J 
 Jackson
 Jacob Green 
 Jealous Loving Heart
 Jeri And Nina's Melody
 Jesus
 Jesus and Children
 Jesus and Nicodemus
 Jesus Announces His Divinity
 Jesus Appears to Disciples
 Jesus Before Caiaphas, Pilate, and Herod
 Jesus Cleanses Temple 
 Jesus Cleanses Temple Again
 Jesus In My Soul (I’ve Got Jesus in My Soul)
 Jesus in the Temple
 Jesus Is Lord
 Jesus Upbraids Scribes and Pharisees
 Jesus Was a Carpenter 
 Jesus Was Our Saviour (Cotton Was Our King)
 Jesus Wept
 Jesus’ Death
 Jesus’ Early Years
 Jesus’ Entry Into Jerusalem
 Jesus’ First Miracle
 Jesus’ Last Words
 Jesus’ Opposition Is Established
 Jesus’ Second Coming
 Jesus’ Teachings
 Jim, I Wore a Tie Today
 Jingle Bells
 Joe Bean
 John 14-1-3
 John Henry
 John the Baptist
 John the Baptist's Imprisonment And Death
 John's
 Johnny 99
 Johnny Reb
 Jordan
 Joshua Gone Barbados
 Joy to the World 
 The Junkie and the Juicehead (Minus Me)
 Just a Closer Walk with Thee
 Just About Time 
 Just As I Am
 Just One More
 Just the Other Side of Nowhere

K 
 Kate
 Kathy
 Katy Too
 Keep on the Sunny Side 
 Keep Your Eyes on Jesus
 Kentucky Straight
 King of Love
 King of The Hill 
 Kleine Rosmarie [Original German song]
 The Kneeling Drunkard's Plea To

L 
 The L and N Don't Stop Here Anymore
 Lady
 The Lady Came from Baltimore
 Land of Israel
 The Last Cowboy Song
 Last Date
 The Last Gunfighter Ballad
 Last Night I Had the Strangest Dream
 The Last of the Drifters
 Last Supper
 The Last Thing on my Mind
 The Last Time
 Lately
 Lately I Been Leanin’ Toward The Blues
 Lay Back With My Woman
 Lay Me Down in Dixie
 Lead Me Father 
 Lead Me Gently Home (Father)
 Leave That Junk Alone 
 A Legend in My Time
 The Legend of John Henry's Hammer
 Let America Be America Again
 Let Him Roll
 Let Me Down Easy
 Let Me Help You Carry This Weight
 Let The Lower Lights Be Burning (Running)
 Let The Train Blow the Whistle 
 Let There Be Country
 Let Those Brown Eyes Smile at Me
 The Letter Edged in Black
 Letter(s) From Home
 Life Goes On 
 Life Has Its Little Ups and Downs
 Life of a Prisoner
 Life's Railway to Heaven 
 Lights of Magdala
 Like a Soldier
 Like a Young Colt 
 Like the 309 
 The Lily of the Valley
 A Little at a Time
 Little Bit of Yesterday
 The Little Drummer Boy
 Little Gray Donkey
 Little Green Fountain 
 Little Magic Glasses 
 Little Man
 Little Mockingbird
 Live Forever
 Living Legend
 Living the Blues
 Living Water and the Bread of Life
 Loading Coal
 Locomotive Man
 Lonesome to the Bone 
 Lonesome Valley 
 (I Heard That) Lonesome Whistle (Blow)
 The Long Black Veil
 Long Legged Guitar Pickin' Man
 Look at Them Beans 
 Look For Me
 Look Unto the East 
 Lookin' Back in Anger
 Lord Is It I
 Lord Take These Hands
 Lord, I'm Coming Home
 Lord, Lord, Lord
 Lord's Prayer Amen Chorus
 Lorena
 Losin' You
 Losing Kind
 Lost on the Desert
 Louisiana Man
 Love Has Lost Again
 Love Is a Gambler
 Love Is My Refuge
 Love Is the Way
 Love Me Like You Used To
 Love Me Tender
 The Love That Never Failed
 Love's Been Good To Me
 Lovin' Locomotive Man
 The Loving Gift
 Lower Lights
 Lumberjack 
 Luther Played The Boogie (Luther's Boogie)

M 
 Mama, You've Been On My Mind 
 Mama's Baby
 The Man Comes Around
 Man In Black 
 Man In White 
 The Man On The Hill
 The Man Who Couldn't Cry
 Mariners And Musicians
 Mary Magdalene Returns To Galilee
 Mary Of The Wild Moor 
 The Masterpiece
 The Matador
 Matchbox
 Matthew 24 (Is Knocking At The Door) 
 Me And Bobby McGee
 Me And Paul 
 Mean As Hell 
 Mean-Eyed Cat 
 Meet Me In Heaven 
 Melva's Wine
 Memories Are Made Of This 
 Mercy Seat
 Merry Christmas Mary
 Michigan City Howdy Do
 Miller's Cave
 The Miracle Man
 Miss Tara 
 Mississippi Delta Land
 Mississippi Sand
 Missouri Waltz
 Mister Garfield 
 Mobile Bay
 Monteagle Mountain
 More Jesus Teaching
 Mother Maybelle
 Mother's Love
 Mountain Dew
 Mountain Lady
 Movin'
 Mr Garfield
 Mr Lonesome
 Muddy Waters
 My Children Walk In Truth 
 My Clinch Mountain Home 
 My Cowboy's Last Ride
 My God Is Real (Yes, God Is Real)
 (My) Grandfather's Clock
 My Merry Christmas Song
 My Mother Was A Lady
 My Old Faded Rose
 My Old Kentucky Home (Turpentine And Dandelion Wine)
 My Ship Will Sail 
 My Shoes Keep Walking Back To You 
 My Treasure 
 My Wife June At Sea Of Galilee
 The Mystery Of Life
 Mystery Of Number Five

N 
 Nashville Skyline Rag
 Nasty Dan
 Navajo
 Nazarene
 Ned Kelly
 Never Grow Old
 New Cut Road 
 New Mexico 
 New Moon Over Jamaica 
 (I'm A) Newborn Man
 News Conference
 The Next In Line
 Next Time I'm In Town
 The Night Hank Williams Came To Town
 Night Life
 The Night They Drove Old Dixie Down
 Nine Pound Hammer 
 No Charge
 No Earthly Good 
 No Expectations 
 No Need To Worry
 No, No, No
 No One Will Ever Know
 No Setting Sun
 Nobody
 Nobody Cared

O 
 O Christmas Tree
 O Come All Ye Faithful
 O Little Town Of Bethlehem 
 Oh Bury Me Not On The Lone Prairie
 Oh Come, Angel Band 
 Oh, Lonesome Me 
 Oh, What A Dream 
 Oh, What A Good Thing We Had 
 The Old Account Was Settled Long Ago
 Old Apache Squaw 
 (I'm Just An) Old Chunk Of Coal (But I'll Be A Diamond Someday) 
 Old Doc Brown 
 Old Fashioned Tree
 Old Gospel Ship
 The Old Rugged Cross
 Old Shep 
 The Old Spinning Wheel
 Old Time Feeling 
 Ole Slew Foot
 On The Evening Train 
 On The Line
 On The Road Again
 On The Trail
 On The Via Dolorosa
 On Wheels And Wings
 Once Before I Die
 One 
 One And One Makes Two
 One More Ride
 One Of These Days I'm Gonna Sit Down And Talk To Paul
 The One On The Right Is On The Left
 One Piece At A Time 
 The One Rose (That's Left In My Heart)
 One Too Many Mornings 
 One Way Rider
 Oney 
 Only Love
 Opening The West
 Orange Blossom Special 
 Orleans Parish Prison
 Orphan Of The Road
 Our Guide Jacob At Mount Tabor
 Out Among The Stars
 Outside Looking In
 Over The Next Hill
 Over There

P 
 Pack Up Your Sorrows 
 Painted Desert
 Papa Was a Good Man
 Parable of the Good Shepherd
 Paradise
 Passin' Thru
 Paul Revere
 (There'll Be) Peace in the Valley (for Me)
 Peggy Day
 Personal Jesus
 Pick a Bale o' Cotton
 Pick the Wildwood Flower 
 Pick Up the Tempo
 Pickin' Time
 Pie in the Sky 
 The Pilgrim
 The Pine Tree
 Please Don't Let Me Out
 Please Don't Play Red River Valley
 Pocahontas 
 Poor Valley Girl
 Port Of Lonely Hearts 
 Praise The Lord And Pass The Soup
 The Preacher Said, “Jesus Said”
 Precious Memories
 The Prisoner's Song
 A Proud Land
 Put The Sugar To Bed

R 
 Ragged Old Flag
 Raising of Lazarus
 Reaching for the Stars
 Reason to Believe
 The Rebel – Johnny Yuma
 Red Velvet
 Redemption 
 Redemption Day
 Redemption Song
 Reflections
 Relief Is Just A Swallow Away
 Remember Me (I'm The One Who Loves You) 
 Remember The Alamo 
 Restless
 Return To The Promised Land
 The Reverend Mr. Black
 Ride This Train
 (Ghost) Riders in the Sky
 Ridin' On The Cotton Belt
 Ring Of Fire
 Ringing The Bells For Jim
 Riot In Cell Block No 9
 The Road Goes On Forever
 The Road To Kaintuck
 Rock And Roll (Fais-Do-Do)
 Rock And Roll Ruby 
 Rock And Roll Shoes
 Rock Island Line
 Rock Of Ages
 Rockabilly Blues (Texas 1955)
 Rocket 69
 Rodeo Hand
 Roll Call
 Rollin’ Free
 Rosanna's Going Wild
 Rose Of My Heart
 Roughneck
 Route #1, Box 144
 Rowboat
 Run Softly, Blue River 
 The Running Kind
 Rusty Cage

S 
 Saginaw, Michigan
 Sailor On A Concrete Sea
 Salty Dog
 Sam Hall 
 Sam Stone
 San Quentin
 Sanctified 
 A Satisfied Mind
 Saturday Night In Hickman County
 Sea Of Heartbreak 
 Seal It In My Heart And Mind
 Seasons Of My Heart
 Second Honeymoon
 See Ruby Fall 
 Send A Picture Of Mother 
 September When It Comes
 Sermon On The Mount
 Shamrock Doesn't Grow In California
 Shantytown 
 She Came from the Mountains
 She's A Go-Er 
 Shepherd Of My Heart 
 The Shifting, Whispering Sands
 Shrimpin’ Sailin’
 Silent Night 
 (That) Silver Haired Daddy Of Mine
 Silver Stallion
 Sing A Song
 Sing A Travelin' Song 
 Sing It Pretty, Sue
 A Singer Of Songs
 Singin’ In Vietnam Talkin’ Blues 
 The Singing Star's Queen
 Single Girl, Married Girl 
 Six Days On The Road
 Six Gun Shooting
 Six White Horses
 Sixteen Tons
 Slow Rider 
 Smiling Bill McCall
 Smokey Factory Blues
 Snow In His Hair 
 So Do I
 So Doggone Lonesome 
 Softly And Tenderly 
 Sold Out of Flagpoles
 Soldier Boy
 Soldier's Last Letter
 Solitary Man
 Someday My Ship Will Sail
 A Song For The Life
 Song Of The Coward
 Song Of The Patriot
 A Song To Mama
 Song To Woody
 Songs That Make A Difference
 The Sons Of Katie Elder
 The Sound Of Laughter
 Southern Accents 
 Southern Comfort 
 Southwestward 
 Southwind 
 Spanish Harlem
 Spiritual
 Stampede
 Standing on the Promises
 Starkville City Jail
 State of the Nation 
 Steel Guitar Rag
 Still in Town
 The Story of a Broken Heart
 Straight A's in Love
 Strange Things Happen Every Day (There Are Strange Things Happening Every Day)
 Strawberry Cake
 The Streets Of Laredo
 Suffer Little Children
 Sugartime 
 Sunday Mornin' Comin' Down
 Sunrise
 Sunset
 Suppertime
 Sweet Betsy from Pike
 Sweeter Than The Flowers
 Swing Low, Sweet Chariot

T 
 T Is For Texas
 Take Me Home 
 The Talking Leaves
 Tall Man
 Taller Than Trees 
 Tear Stained Letter 
 Tears In The Holston River
 Tell Him I'm Gone 
 Temptation
 The Ten Commandments
 The Ten Commandments Of Love
 Tennessee Flat-Top Box 
 Tennessee Stud
 Texas
 Texas 1947
 Thanks A Lot 
 Thanks To You
 That Christmasy Feeling
 That Lucky Old Sun (Just Rolls Around Heaven All Day) 
 That Old Time Feeling
 That Old Wheel
 That Silver Haired Daddy Of Mine 
 That's All Over 
 That's Alright Mama
 That's Enough 
 That's How I Got To Memphis
 That's One You Owe Me 
 That's The Truth
 That's The Way It Is
 That's What It's Like To Be Lonesome
 There Ain’t No Easy Run
 There Ain't No Good Chain Gang
 There Are Strange Things Happening Every Day
 There Is (There's) A Bear In The Woods
 There You Go
 (There'll Be) Peace In The Valley (For Me) 
 These Are My People

 These Things Shall Pass 
 They Killed Him
 They're All The Same
 A Thing Called Love
 Thirteen
 This Is Nazareth
 This Land Is Your Land
 This Ole House
 This Side Of The Law
 This Town
 This Train Is Bound For Glory
 Thoughts On The Flag
 The Three Bells
 Thunderball
 Tiger Whitehead
 The Timber Man
 Time And Time Again
 Time Changes Everything
 Time Of The Preacher
 To All The Girls I've Loved Before 
 To Beat The Devil 
 To The Shining Mountains 
 Tonight I'll Be Staying Here With You
 Tony
 Too Little, Too Late
 Town Of Cana
 Train Of Love 
 Transfusion Blues 
 The Troubadour
 Trouble In Mind
 Troublesome Waters
 True Love Is Greater Than Friendship
 True Love Travels A Gravel Road
 The Twentieth Century Is Almost Over
 Two Greatest Commandments
 Two Old Army Pals
 Two Stories Wide
 Two Timin' Woman

U 
 Unchained
 Uncloudy Day
 Under The Double Eagle
 Understand Your Man
 Unwed Fathers

V 
 The Vanishing Race
 Vaya Con Dios
 The Very Biggest Circus Of Them All
 Veteran's Day
 Viel zu spät [German version of "I Got Stripes"]
 Virgien

W 
 W. Lee O Daniel (And The Light Crust Dough Boys)
 Wabash Blues 
 The Wabash Cannonball
 Waiting For A Long Time
 Waiting For A Southern Train
 Waiting For A Train 
 Walkin’ The Blues
 The Wall
 The Walls Of A Prison
 The Wanderer 
 Walk the Line
 Wanted Man 
 Water From The Wells Of Home 
 Wayfaring Stranger 
 Waymore's Blues
 The Ways Of A Woman In Love
 The Wayworn Traveler
 We Are The Shepherds 
 We Must Believe In Magic
 We Ought To Be Ashamed
 We Remember The King
 We'll Meet Again
 We’re All In Your Corner
 We’re For Love
 Wednesday Car
 Welcome Back Jesus
 Welfare Line
 Wer kennt den Weg [German version of I Walk the Line]
 Were You There (When They Crucified My Lord)
 West Canterbury Subdivision Blues 
 The West
 What Child Is This
 What Do I Care
 What Have You Got Planned Tonight, Diana 
 What I’ve Learned
 What Is Man 
 What Is Truth 
 What On Earth (Will You Do For Heaven's Sake)
 What'd I Say
 What's Good For You (Should Be Alright For Me)
 When He Comes 
 When He Reached Down His Hand For Me
 When I Look
 When I Stop Dreaming 
 When I Take My Vacation In Heaven 
 When I'm Gray
 When I’ve Learned (Enough To Die)
 When It's Springtime In Alaska (It's Forty Below) 
 When Papa Played The Dobro
 (When) The Man Comes Around 
 When The Roll Is Called Up Yonder 
 When The Roses Bloom Again 
 When The Saviour Reached Down For Me
 When Uncle Bill Quit Dope
 When You Are Twenty One
 Where Did We Go Right 
 Where I Found You
 Where The Soul Of Man Never Dies
 Where We'll Never Grow Old 
 While I've Got It On My Mind 
 The Whirl And The Suck
 White Christmas
 White Girl
 Who At My Door Is Standing
 Who Kept The Sheep 
 Who's Gene Autry?
 Why Do You Punish Me (For Loving You) 
 Why Is A Fire Engine Red
 Why Me, Lord?
 Wichita Lineman
 Wide Open Road 
 Wilderness Temptation
 Wildwood Flower 
 Wildwood In The Pines
 Will The Circle Be Unbroken
 Will You Miss Me When I'm Gone
 The Wind Changes
 The Winding Stream
 Wings In The Morning 
 Without Love
 Wo ist Zuhause, Mama [German version of Five Feet High and Rising]
 W-O-M-A-N
 The Wonder Of You
 A Wonderful Time Up There
 Woodcarver
 The World Needs A Melody
 World's Gonna Fall On You
 Worried Man
 Worried Man Blues
 Worried Mind
 Would You Lay with Me (In a Field of Stone) 
 A Wound Time Can't Erase
 The Wreck Of The Old 97
 Wrinkled, Crinkled, Wadded Dollar Bill

Y 
 You And Me
 You And Tennessee 
 You Are My Sunshine
 You Are (You're) The Nearest Thing To Heaven
 You Beat All I Ever Saw
 You Can't Beat Jesus Christ
 You Comb Her Hair 
 You Dreamer You 
 You Give Me Music
 You (Just) Can't Beat Jesus Christ
 You Remembered Me
 You Tell Me
 You Wild Colorado 
 You Win Again
 You Won't Have Far to Go
 You'll Be All Right
 You'll Get Yours And I'll Get Mine
 You'll Never Walk Alone
 You're Driftin’ Away
 You're Home Sweet Home To Me
 You're My Baby (Little Woolly Booger)
 You're So Close To Me
 You're The Nearest Thing To Heaven
 You've Got A New Light Shining In Your Eyes

References

Cash, Johnny
Johnny Cash songs